USS Isla de Cuba was a  protected cruiser of the United States Navy captured from the Spanish Navy during the Spanish–American War. Originally named Isla de Cuba for the Spanish colony of Cuba, the ship was ordered from the British shipbuilding company Sir W.G. Armstrong Mitchell & Company in January 1886 and laid down on 25 February 1886. The ship was launched on 11 December 1886 and completed in 1887. The vessel fought in the Rif War before being assigned to Spain's fleet in the Philippines. When the Spanish fleet in the Philippines was attacked by the United States Navy during the Battle of Manila Bay, Isla de Cuba was scuttled to prevent capture. However, the Americans raised the ship and commissioned her into the United States Navy in 1900 and assigned to the Asiatic Station, keeping the same name. In US service, the ship, rerated as a gunboat, was used to suppress the Philippine Revolution. The vessel was taken out of American service in 1904, becoming a school ship. In 1912, the US sold the ship to Venezuela which renamed her Mariscal Sucre. The ship was scrapped in 1940.

Characteristics
In January 1886, Spain placed orders for two small protected cruisers,  and Isla de Cuba with the British shipbuilding company Armstrongs to be built at their Elswick, Tyne and Wear shipyard. The ship was powered by steam from two cylindrical boilers fed to two sets of horizontal triple expansion engines constructed by R & W Hawthorn Leslie.

The ship was built with a main armament of six  guns, with a secondary battery of four 6-pounder (57 mm guns), and three  torpedo tubes. Isla de Cuba had a steel hull and one funnel. Having a wide beam for her length, she had poor seakeeping qualities and tended to bury her bow in waves. The vessel had a complement of 164.

Service history

Spanish Navy

Isla de Cuba was laid down on 25 February 1886 by Sir W.G. Armstrong Mitchell & Company at their yard in Newcastle upon Tyne, United Kingdom. The ship was launched on 11 December 1886, and completed on 22 September 1887. Upon completion, Isla de Cuba joined the Metropolitan Fleet in Spain. She participated in the Rif War of 1893–1894, bombarding the reef between Melilla ad Chafarinos. When an insurrection broke out in the Philippines, Isla de Cuba was sent there in 1897 to join the squadron of Rear Admiral Patricio Montojo de Pasaron.

She was still part of Montojo's squadron when the Spanish–American War began in April 1898. The resulting Battle of Manila Bay was the first major engagement of the Spanish–American War.

The American squadron made a series of firing passes, wreaking great havoc on the Spanish ships. At first, Dewey's ships concentrated their fire on Montojo's flagship, unprotected cruiser , and on unprotected cruiser , and Isla de Cuba suffered little damage.  When Reina Cristina was disabled, Isla de Cuba and her sister ship, Isla de Luzón, came alongside the sinking Reina Cristina to assist her under heavy American gunfire. Admiral Montojo shifted his flag to Isla de Cuba. When Montojo's squadron had been battered into submission, Isla de Cuba was scuttled in shallow water to avoid capture. Her upper works remained above the water, and a team from gunboat  went aboard and set Isla de Cuba on fire.

After the United States occupied the Philippines, the United States Navy seized, salvaged, and repaired Isla de Cuba. The U.S. Navy took possession of her, refloated her, and repaired her damage. The Spanish  guns were removed and replaced with  guns.

United States Navy
Isla de Cuba was commissioned into the United States Navy on 11 April 1900 at Hong Kong, China. The ship was assigned to the Asiatic Station after undergoing repairs and rerated as a gunboat. Isla de Cuba was used as a supply ship and patrol boat during the Philippine Revolution in the Philippines following the Spanish–American War. In March–April 1900 the ship was part of the Southern Squadron. As part of blockading the island of Samar, Isla de Cuba played a key part in disrupting supplies to the Philippine insurgents' and in abetting the capture of Vicente Lukbán, the insurgent leader in Samar. On 17 November 1900, the ship landed a battalion at Ormoc, Leyte, to hold the town after the garrison had been sent away to deal with Philippine insurgents. The battalion remained at Ormoc until 8 December. In 1901, Isla de Cuba was used as a survey ship to survey Ormoc anchorage and Parasan Harbor.

On 4 March 1904, Isla de Cuba left Cebu, which marked the end of the ship's deployment to the Asiatic Station. The ship returned to the United States where Isla de Cuba was decommissioned on 9 June at Portsmouth, New Hampshire. The ship was repaired at Portsmouth which were completed on 21 March 1907. Isla de Cuba was then loaned to the Maryland Naval Militia for use as a school ship.

Venezuela Navy
The vessel was renamed Mariscal Sucre, after Marshall Antonio José de Sucre. Mariscal Sucre served in the Venezuelan Navy until she was scrapped in 1940.

See also

Notes

References

Citations

Bibliography
 
 
 Gray, Randal, Ed. Conway's All the World's Fighting Ships 1906–1921. Annapolis, Maryland: Naval Institute Press, 1985. .

Further reading
 Alden, John D. The American Steel Navy: A Photographic History of the U.S. Navy from the Introduction of the Steel Hull in 1883 to the Cruise of the Great White Fleet, 1907–1909. Annapolis, Maryland: Naval Institute Press, 1972. .

External links
 
 Navsource.org: USS Isla de Cuba
 Department of the Navy: Naval Historical Center: Online Library of Selected Images: Spanish Navy Ships: 'Isla de Cuba'' (Cruiser, 1886–1898)

Cruisers of the Spanish Navy
Cruisers of the United Kingdom
Ships built on the River Tyne
1886 ships
Gunboats of the United States Navy
Ships transferred from the United States Navy to the Bolivarian Navy of Venezuela
Naval ships of Venezuela
Isla de Luzon-class cruisers
Spanish–American War cruisers of Spain
Vessels captured by the United States Navy
Maritime incidents in 1898
Shipwrecks of the Philippines
Shipwrecks in the South China Sea
Shipwrecks of the Spanish–American War
Ships built by Armstrong Whitworth